Makronia is a census town in Sagar district in the Indian state of Madhya Pradesh.

Demographics
 India census, Makronia had a population of 23,861. Males constitute 52% of the population and females 48%. Makronia has an average literacy rate of 87.75%, higher than the national average of 74.4%: male literacy is 92.65%, and female literacy is 82.41%. In Makronia, 11.86% of the population is under 6 years of age.

References

Sagar, Madhya Pradesh
Cities and towns in Sagar district